Wollongong Showground, known as WIN Stadium for sponsorship reasons, is a multi-purpose stadium located in Wollongong, Australia. The stadium was officially opened in 1911. From 1982 until 1998 it played host to every home match for the Illawarra Steelers NRL team, and is still the team's home ground in the lower grade competitions. It is now used as one home ground of the St George Illawarra Dragons rugby league side and Wollongong Wolves of the National Premier Leagues NSW.

History

Origin
The stadium was originally used primarily for agricultural shows and hosted a greyhound racing track as well, the name of the venue prior to 1911 was the Wollongong Showground. It is considered to be officially opened in 1911, when the sport of rugby league began playing at the stadium. The last greyhound meeting was held on 19 March 1984.

When the Illawarra Steelers entered the NSWRFL premiership in 1982, they played their home games at the stadium. Six years after their inception into the competition, the Steelers along with the then Showground Trust converted the ground into a rectangle. In 1992 the southern stand was built. WIN Television purchased the naming rights to the stadium in 1997.

Development
In April 2002, an $8 million upgrade to the stadium saw the opening of a new Northern Grandstand. The 6,000 seat grandstand also brought increased corporate entertainment facilities. WIN Corporation provided half of the funding for the upgrade.

In 2006, redevelopment was meant to begin on the stadium's western stand. The western grandstand was to be demolished and replaced by a new stand which was to hold 2500 general seats, 20 corporate boxes as well as media facilities and food and beverage outlets. The $37 million redevelopment was to see a four-star hotel integrated into the stadium which would have allowed fans to watch sporting events from the comfort of their hotel room. The WIN Stadium Trust believed that the redevelopment would provide significant job opportunities locally and bring in new revenue of approximately $2.1 million per year. However, in late 2006 the NSW State Government decided against funding the much needed upgrade. The financial viability of a $100 million proposal for the redevelopment of the western grandstand was questioned by State Cabinet.

In October 2009, the NSW Labor Government announced $28.9 million in funding for the construction of a new western stand, under a revised plan. The new western grandstand will be a much simpler design than the original "hotel stand" but will result in a much larger ground capacity. The new stand will seat 6,170, taking WIN Stadium's ground capacity to approximately 23,750.

On 20 September 2011, high winds bucked the western grandstand roof which was still under construction, causing a redesign and delay in the opening of the stand with the upper tier not being ready for occupancy until half-way through the 2012 NRL season.

Future
Following the announcement of the $28.9mil western stand redevelopment, it would seem that WIN Stadium will remain as the region's major sporting facility. Also, as further commercial and residential development occurs in the eastern and southern city areas, parking will become an even bigger issue. WIN Stadium is practically reliant on street parking.

Many critics of the stadium claim that the Illawarra region would be better served by moving the stadium from the current site and building a new stadium in a better location. Kembla Grange, J.J. Kelly Park, Thomas Dalton Park and Shellharbour City Stadium in Albion Park are often suggested as alternative sites for a major sporting precinct.

Current uses
The primary tenants of WIN Stadium are the St. George Illawarra Dragons rugby league team, who play five of their twelve home games there (the rest are played at UOW Jubilee Oval, in the St. George area). The current attendance record for WIN Stadium was set during a NRL finals match, when 19,608 watched the Dragons defeat rivals the Cronulla Sharks.

The Illawarra Steelers lower grade sides currently play home games at the venue, as they have for the past thirty two years.

WIN Stadium hosted its first rugby league international during the 2008 Rugby League World Cup, with Fiji, led by Parramatta Eels star Jarryd Hayne, defeating France 42-6 in front of 9,213 fans. The stadium also played host to two pool games of the 2003 Rugby World Cup: Canada defeated Tonga 24–7 in front of 15,630 fans, and France defeated the United States 41–14 in front of a crowd of 17,833.

The Wollongong Wolves who currently compete in the National Premier Leagues NSW, also play their home games at WIN Stadium.

WIN Stadium is also used by the Illawarriors rugby union team during the Shute Shield. It also hosts the Grand Final in the local Illawarra Rugby competition.

On 22 February 2014 the ground hosted its first Charity Shield match.

On 9 November 2014, WIN Stadium hosted its first rugby league international since the 2008 World Cup, and the first ever appearance of the Australian national team in Wollongong when the Kangaroos played Samoa in the final round robin game of the 2014 Four Nations. The game, which was expected to break the ground record attendance of 19,608, attracted 18,456 fans who saw the Kangaroos defeat Samoa 44–18 to book a spot in the tournament Final against New Zealand.

On 3 January 2015, WIN Stadium played host to its first top-flight soccer match since the demise of the National Soccer League with A-League side Sydney FC playing Newcastle Jets and the following day Iran played Iraq in an international friendly match.

On 10 February 2018, WIN Stadium hosted the first Super League game to be played outside of Europe when Wigan Warriors faced Hull FC, with Wigan coming out on top by a score of 24-10.

Accessibility
There is a five-bus drop-off bay located at the WIN Entertainment Centre, which is located next to the stadium behind the northern grandstand. The nearest train station is the Wollongong station, which is approximately 1.4 kilometres (20 minutes walk) from the stadium. As the stadium is located at the eastern end of the Wollongong Central Business District, there is a well suited public transport infrastructure. Street parking is available, though parking complexes (such as the Wollongong City Council Carpark) are usually much more accessible.

On game days when St George Illawarra play at WIN Stadium, a shuttle bus service runs between Wollongong station and the stadium. Also, surrounding streets (including sections of Harbour Street, Marine Drive and eastern Crown Street) are closed to traffic.

Attendance records

Rugby league test matches
List of rugby league test and World Cup matches played at the Wollongong Showground.

Rugby World Cup
The stadium hosted two games of the 2003 Rugby World Cup which was held in Australia.

Gallery

References

External links
WIN Stadium official website
WIN Sports and Entertainment Centres official website
St. George Illawarra Dragons official website

Redevelopment notes

Rugby league stadiums in Australia
Rugby union stadiums in Australia
Soccer venues in New South Wales
Rugby League World Cup stadiums
Rugby World Cup stadiums
Sport in Wollongong
Multi-purpose stadiums in Australia
1911 establishments in Australia
Sports venues completed in 1911
Illawarra Steelers
Wollongong Wolves FC
A-League Women stadiums
Sydney FC (A-League Women)
Illawarra Cutters
Defunct greyhound racing venues in Australia